Robert Adams (January 21, 1928 – March 2, 1997) was an American Advaita teacher.  In later life Adams held satsang with a small group of devotees in California, US. He mainly advocated the path of jñāna yoga with an emphasis on the practice of self-enquiry. Adams' teachings were not well known in his lifetime, but have since been widely circulated amongst those investigating the philosophy of Advaita and the Western devotees of Bhagavan Sri Ramana Maharshi. A book of his teachings, Silence of the Heart: Dialogues with Robert Adams, was published in 1999.

Biography

Early life 

Robert Adams was born on January 21, 1928, in Manhattan and grew up in New York City, USA. Adams claimed that from as far back as he could remember, he had had visions of a white haired, bearded man seated at the foot of his bed, who was about two feet tall, and who used to talk to him in a language which he did not understand. He told his parents but they thought he was playing games. He would later find out that this man was a vision of his future guru Sri Ramana Maharshi. At the age of seven, Adams's father died and the visitations suddenly stopped.

Adams said that he then developed a siddhi whereby whenever he wanted something, from a candy bar to a violin, all he needed to do was say the name of the object three times and the desired object would appear from somewhere, or be given to him by someone. If there was a test at school, Adams would simply say 'God, God, God' and the answers would immediately come to him; no prior study was necessary.

Awakening 
 
Adams claimed to have had a profound spiritual awakening at the age of fourteen. It was the end of term finals maths test and Adams had not studied for it at all. As was his custom he said 'God' three times, but with a phenomenal and unintended outcome:

Not long after this experience, Adams went to the school library to do a book report. While passing through the philosophy section he came across a book on yoga masters. Having no idea what yoga was, he opened the book and for the first time saw a photo of the man he had experienced visions of as a young child, Bhagavan Sri Ramana Maharshi.

Journey to the Guru 
 
At the age of 16, Adams' first spiritual mentor was Joel S. Goldsmith, a Christian mystic from New York, whom he used to visit in Manhattan, in order to listen to his sermons. Goldsmith helped Adams to better understand his enlightenment and advised him to go and see Paramahansa Yogananda. Adams did so and visited Yogananda at the Self-Realization Fellowship in Encinitas, California, where he intended to be initiated as a monk. However, after speaking to him, Yogananda felt that Adams had his own path and should go to India. He told him that his satguru was Sri Ramana Maharshi and that he should go to him as soon as possible because Ramana Maharshi's body was old and in ill-health. Sri Ramana Maharshi lived at Sri Ramanasramam at the foot of Arunachala in Tamil Nadu, South India.

Ramana Maharshi 
 
With $14,000 of inheritance money from a recently deceased aunt, Adams set off for India and his guru Sri Ramana Maharshi in 1946:

Adams stayed at Sri Ramanasramam for the final three years of Sri Ramana Maharshi's life.  Over the course of this time he had many conversations with Sri Ramana Maharshi, and through abiding in his presence was able to confirm and further understand his own experience of awakening to the non-dual Self. In the first of these conversations, Ramana Maharshi told Adams they had been together in a previous life. After Sri Ramana Maharshi left the body in 1950 Adams spent a further seventeen years travelling around India and stayed with well known gurus such as Nisargadatta Maharaj, Anandamayi Ma, Neem Karoli Baba and Swami Ramdas to name but a few. He also spent time with less well-known teachers such as Swami Brahmadanda "the Staff of God" in the holy city of Varanasi.

Later years 

In the late 1960s, Adams returned to the United States and lived in Hawaii and Los Angeles before finally moving to Sedona, Arizona in the mid 1990s. He was married to Nicole Adams and fathered two daughters. In the 1980s Adams developed Parkinson's disease, which forced him to settle in one location and receive the appropriate care. A small group of devotees soon grew up around him and in the early 1990s he gave weekly satsangs in the San Fernando Valley, along with other surrounding areas of Los Angeles. These satsangs were both recorded and transcribed. After several years of deteriorating health, Adams died on March 2, 1997 in Sedona, Arizona, where he was surrounded by family members and devotees. He died at the age of 69 from cancer of the liver.

Controversy 

None of Robert Adams claims of visiting India or Ramana Ashram have ever been verified by anyone except himself. His claims of living in Arthur Osborne's house have been questioned by Katya Osborne and Michael James and found to be likely made up. Also Ramana Ashram's The Mountain Path has concluded Robert Adams was never there:  

His claim to remember crib age experiences is regarded as fantasy. The earliest age of memory recall is 2 years old even for major events like hospitalization and a sibling birth.

Related teachers 

In 1992, Ramana Maharshi's nephew V. Ganesan had a chance encounter at an airport in Los Angeles, where a student of Robert Adams approached him to ask if he would like to attend Satsang. V. Ganesan eventually met Robert Adams on multiple occasions and acclaimed him to be a fully realized Jnani. H.W.L. Poonja, a direct disciple of Ramana Maharshi who was a vehement critic of most contemporary teachers, liked Adams' teachings enough to read them out during several of his own Satsangs. Rupert Spira, the Advaita teacher, author and potter visited Robert Adams two days before Adams' death in 1997, where he learned about his then to be teacher Francis Lucille, who had previously met Adams. Many of Adams' students went on to become teachers, including Ed Muzika, Luis De Santiago, Stuart Schwartz, Pamela Wilson and John Taylor.

Teachings

Confessions of a Jnani 
 

Adams did not consider himself to be a teacher, a philosopher or a preacher. What he imparted he said was simply the confession of a jnani. He said he confessed his and everyone else's own reality, and encouraged students not to listen to him with their heads but with their hearts. Adams' way of communicating to his devotees was often funny, and with interludes of silence or music between questions and answers. He stated that there was no such thing as a new teaching. This knowledge could be found in the Upanishads, the Vedas and other Hindu scriptures.

Silence of the Heart 

Adams did not write any books himself nor publish his teachings as he did not wish to gain a large following. He instead preferred to teach a small number of dedicated seekers. However, in 1992, a book of his dialogues was transcribed, compiled and distributed by and for the sole use of his devotees. In 1999, a later edition of this book, Silence of the Heart: Dialogues with Robert Adams, was posthumously published by Acropolis Books Inc. As conveyed by the title of these dialogues, Adams considered silence to be the highest of spiritual teachings:

Advaita Vedanta 

Although Adams was never initiated into a religious order or spiritual practice, nor became a renunciate, his teachings were described by Dennis Waite as being firmly based in the Vedic philosophy and Hindu tradition of Advaita Vedanta. Advaita (non-dual in sanskrit) refers to the ultimate and supreme reality, Brahman, which according to Ramana Maharshi, as interpreted by some of his devotees, is the substratum of the manifest universe, and if describable at all, could be defined as pure consciousness. Another term for Brahman is Ātman. The word Ātman is used when referring to Brahman as the inmost spirit of man. Ātman and Brahman are not different realities, but identical in nature. Adams used a metaphor to explain this:

Those in search of liberation from the manifest world will gain it only when the mind becomes quiescent. The world is in fact nothing other than the creation of the mind, and only by the removal of all thoughts, including the 'I' thought, will the true reality of Brahman shine forth. Adams taught self-enquiry, as previously taught by Sri Ramana Maharshi, in order to achieve this.

Self-enquiry 

In his weekly satsangs Adams advocated the practice of self-enquiry (ātma-vichāra) as the principal means of transcending the ego and realising oneself as sat-chit-ananda (being-consciousness-bliss). After acknowledging to oneself that one exists, and that whether awake, dreaming or in deep sleep one always exists, one then responds to every thought that arises with the question "Who am I?":

Four Principles of Self-Realization 
 
Adams rarely gave a sadhana to his devotees, however, he did often have visions, and in one such vision he gave a teaching as the Buddha. He visualised himself sitting under a tree in a beautiful open field with a lake and a forest nearby. He was wearing the orange garb of a Buddhist renunciate. All of a sudden hundreds of bodhisattvas and mahasattvas came out of the forest and sat down in a semi-circle around Adams as the Buddha. Together they proceeded to meditate for several hours. Afterwards, one of the bodhisattvas stood up and asked the Buddha what he taught. The Buddha answered, "I teach Self-realization of Noble Wisdom." Again they sat in silence for three hours before another bodhisattva stood up and asked how one could tell whether they were close to self-realization. In reply, Adams as the Buddha, gave the bodhisattvas and mahasattvas four principles, which he named The Four Principles of Self-Realization of Noble Wisdom: 

First Principle: You have a feeling, a complete understanding that everything you see, everything in the universe, in the world, emanates from your mind. In other words, you feel this. You do not have to think about it, or try to bring it on. It comes by itself. It becomes a part of you. The realization that everything you see, the universe, people, worms, insects, the mineral kingdom, the vegetable kingdom, your body, your mind, everything that appears, is a manifestation of your mind.
Second Principle: You have a strong feeling, a deep realization, that you are unborn. You are not born, you do not experience a life, and you do not disappear, you do not die ... You exist as I Am. You have always existed and you will always exist. You exist as pure intelligence, as absolute reality. That is your true nature. You exist as sat-chit-ananda. You exist as bliss consciousness ... But you do not exist as the body. You do not exist as person, place or thing.
Third Principle: You are aware and you have a deep understanding of the egolessness of all things; that everything has no ego. I'm not only speaking of sentient beings. I'm speaking of the mineral kingdom, the vegetable kingdom, the animal kingdom, the human kingdom. Nothing has an ego. There is no ego ... It means that everything is sacred. Everything is God. Only when the ego comes, does God disappear ... When there is no ego, you have reverence for everybody and everything ... There is only divine consciousness, and everything becomes divine consciousness.
Fourth Principle: You have a deep understanding, a deep feeling, of what self-realization of noble wisdom really is ... You can never know by trying to find out what it is, because it's absolute reality. You can only know by finding out what it is not. So you say, it is not my body, it is not my mind, it is not my organs, it is not my thoughts, it is not my world, it is not my universe, it is not the animals, or the trees, or the moon, or the sun, or the stars, it is not any of those things. When you've gone through everything and there's nothing left, that's what it is. Nothing. Emptiness. Nirvana. Ultimate Oneness.

Imaginative story teller 

Although Robert Adams' stories of staying at Ramana Ashram and having personal talks with Ramana have been regarded by some as entertaining, Kitty Osborne (longtime Ashram resident) and others have noted that the stories appear to come from someone who had almost no idea about the actual situation at Ramana Ashram or Ramana’s habits.

For example Robert Adams recalls staying at the ashram for over eight months attending all of Ramana’s meetings yet was never seen, noted, or remembered by anyone who was actually there, when in actuality Westerners were always noted, written about and photographed by the Ashram, as a visit from a Westerner was highly unusual and always well documented.  

Robert claimed to have personal English conversations with Ramana without a translator apparently not knowing that Ramana generally never spoke English without a translator. Robert told one such story at length during his August 2, 1992, satsang about a chat at the Osborne house in which he says the two talked about various things such as self-enquiry, the maturity and sincerity of seekers, and a number of other topics.   Kitty Osborne noted the unlikelihood:

Robert Adams claimed to have private personal visits with Ramana inside the Osborne house when in actuality Ramana never went inside a grihasta (householder’s) home after 1896 and did not leave the ashram front gates after 1929 except on two well noted occasions, neither of which involved going to the Osborne house. 

In his Aug. 9th 1992 satsang, Robert told a story of sadhus rolling boulders down the hill from the caves above Skandashram attempting to murder Ramana, apparently unaware that there are no caves above Skandashram despite previously claiming to have lived there for years. Something that would have been noticed in minutes by anyone who was actually there. 

Many of Robert’s fictional stories involved money that did not take into account for the monetary inflation that happened in India between the 1940s and 1990s such as his story of Henry Wells:

Apparently Robert failed to realize the unlikelihood of a Scotsman donating dollars and the fact that $40k in 1950 could have likely bought the entire town of Tiruvannamalai and most certainly would have at least been noted by someone at the ashram itself.  

Robert claimed to have donated a jeep to the Ashram when no jeep or car was ever possessed by the ashram until 2018.

According to Ed Muzika in his Yoga Journal article of Jan/Feb 1998,

Of course Ramana never treated anyone as special or claimed to have been waiting for them to finally arrive.

Mr. Adams claimed Ramana used to cover himself with mud and tell visitors that Ramana doesn't live here anymore in order to get rid of them, when in fact Ramana never lied about anything, always was scrupulously clean, and always warmly welcomed all comers to the ashram, Pundits or not.

While events in many of Robert's stories were claimed to have happened to him, they could actually be found in various Hindu texts. Others were highly imaginative descriptions meant to contain some type of parable or spiritual truth which he apparently made up on the spot and told entertainingly as "first-person" accounts.

Publications 

Adams, Robert (1999). Silence of the Heart: Dialogues with Robert Adams, Acropolis Books Inc.

See also 

Ramana Maharshi
Paramahansa Yogananda
Joel S. Goldsmith
Nisargadatta Maharaj
Anandamayi Ma
Neem Karoli Baba
Paramacharya
Advaita Vedanta
Brahman
Self-enquiry
Jnana Yoga
Lankavatara Sutra
Siddhi

References

Notes

Citations

Sources

Published sources

Web-sources

External links 
 Keep Quiet - a website with quotes by Robert Adams
 
The Mystery of Robert Adams - personal remembrances of time with Robert Adams website

1928 births
1997 deaths
Advaitin philosophers
American spiritual teachers
People from New York City
Neo-Advaita teachers